The system of Russian forms of addressing is used by the speakers of Russian languages to linguistically encode relative social status, degree of respect and the nature of interpersonal relationship. Typical linguistic tools employed for this purpose include using different parts of a person's full name, name suffixes, and honorific plural.

Linguistic instruments

T–V distinction
The most important, grammaticalized distinction is between plain (T) and honorific (V) form, the latter being expressed through honorific second person plural, reflected both in personal pronouns and verb declension. Historically, it used to be accompanied by slovoyers (enclitic -s added to one or several words of a phrase) and analytic verb form “изволить + infinitive”, both of which gradually fell out of use.

The choice between T and V forms is influenced by a number of factors, such as relative age and position, relationship between the speaker and the addressee, as well the general formality of the situation.
Generally, T-form is reserved to informal communication between friends and family members. Depending on the corporate culture, it may also be used between colleagues of the same age. Sometimes T-form is used unilaterally to address one's inferiors, e.g. by a boss addressing employees or by a teacher addressing students, or by and elder addressing junior.

V-form is used in all formal circumstances, to address elders and superiors, or just to express respect and politeness. It is characterized by using second plural form of second person pronoun (often capitalized in writing to distinguish from actual plural) and second person plural verb forms in all moods. Hortative mood has special polite form ending with –те (-te): пойдёмте (poydemte) instead of пойдём (poydem).

Appellations

Name

Modern East Slavic names are tripartite, consisting of family name, given name, and patronymic. Each of these components can be used alone or in different combinations; additionally, most given names have suppletively derived short form, which can be further suffixed to produce a number of diminutives conveying different emotional meaning and applicable in different contexts.

Other appellations
Much like other languages, in East Slavic one can address a person by words other than name or nickname, which can be divided into polite (e.g. господин (gospodin), “sir”), vernacular (e.g. братан (bratan), “bro”) and codified (such as military ranks and styles of office). Some of them may serve as titles, prefixing a person's name.

Styles in Russian Empire

From the time of Peter the Great, forms of address in the Russian Empire had been well-codified, determined by a person's title of honor, as well as military or civil rank (see Table of Ranks) and ecclesiastical order. One's position within the clergy was considered most important, followed by title, and then by civil/military rank, e.g. a commoner in rank of Privy Councilor would be styled His Excellency, a prince of the same rank would retain the style of His Highness, while the same prince serving as an archbishop would be referred as His High Eminence. All of these styles are now obsolete and are only used in historical context.

Modern Styles of Office

Unlike English and many other languages, addressing a person by their office is highly uncommon outside of protocol context (e.g. even during an official meeting it is very unlikely for anybody to personally address a chairman as “Mr. Chairman”). On the other hand, military or paramilitary rank is commonly used, either as a title before one's name, or by itself, usually preceded by the title товарищ (comrade), e.g. лейтенант Петров (lieutenant Petrov), or товарищ лейтенант (lieutenant, sir; literally “comrade lieutenant”).

Common titles and appellations

During the Soviet era, the word товарищ (comrade) served as a universal form of address. Later it fell out of use due to its sexlessness and political connotations, while pre-soviet styles seemed either archaic or too pompous (with the possible exception of Ukrainian language, where the old honorific пан (pan) seems to be successfully readopted). Eventually, such words as девушка (lady), молодой человек (young man), and even мужчина (man) and женщина (woman) have been adopted as default forms of addressing strangers, which may seem awkward or even rude to a foreigner.

Below is the list of common East Slavic titles given in Russian Cyrillic spelling and English transcription. Note that some of them can be only used alone, while others can become prefixes before names or other appellations.

Forms of address
By using different parts of a person's name in different forms, combined with T- or V-addressing, with or without titles and honorifics, one can produce at least 20 forms of address, all of which are fairly common, but used in different circumstances, as explained below:

Full name + Patronymic + Surname

Highly formal, used in documents or official setting. Surname-first order is considered bureaucratic, and name-first order more organic

Example:
Кузнецов Иван Петрович, согласны ли Вы взять в жёны Смирнову Марию Ивановну?
Kuznetsov Ivan Petrovich, do you agree to take Smirnova Mary Ivanovna to be your wife
English equivalent:
Ivan Kuznetsov, do you agree to take Mary Smirnova to be your wife?

Full name + Patronymic

General polite form of addressing, comparable to English Mr./Ms. + Surname

Example:
[to Ivan Petrovich Kuznetsov]: Мы согласны с Вашим предложением, Иван Петрович
We agree to your (pl.) offer, Ivan Petrovich
English equivalent:
We agree to your offer, Mr. Kuznetsov

Title + Surname

Feature of bureaucratic speech used in certain official contexts

Example
Гражданин Сидоров, Вы арестованы!
Citizen Sidorov, you are under arrest!
English equivalent:
Mr. Smith, you are under arrest

NB: the above three forms sound unnatural with T-form of address, but may be used ironically or sarcastically

Appellation only

T-form: Used to informally address strangers in certain situations

Example A
Мужик, смотри, куда прёшь!
Hey man (brute), watch where you are going
English equivalent:
Watch your step, man!

Example B
[to a police officer]: Отпусти меня, начальник
Let go (sing.) of me, boss!
English equivalent:
Let me go, officer

V-form: Used to address strangers politely

Example
Мужчина, вы куда?!
Man, where are you (pl.) [going] to?
English equivalent:
Where are you going, mister?

Title + Given name

Common feature of baby-talk with тётя (tyotya) and дядя (dyadya) titles and either full or short form of given name, T and V  forms both acceptable; also used towards and between clergy with such titles as отец (otets, "father"), брат (brat, "brother"). Marginal examples of other usage exist, e.g. a renowned revolutionary Theodor Sergeyev used a nickname “Comrade Artyom” (Artyom being a male given name).

Example A:
[a child to a family friend Ivan]: Дядя Ваня, ты ещё приедешь?
Uncle Vanya (short form of male given name Ivan), will you (sg.) come (sg.) again?
English equivalent:
Will you come again, uncle Ivan?
Example B:
[exempt from a satirical poem about Soviet bureaucrats] Товарищ Надя, // К празднику прибавка
Comrade Nadya (short form of female given name Nadezhda), [I’ve got] a pay rise on account of a [state] holiday
Example C:
Исповедуйте меня, отец Василий!
Hear (pl.) my confession, father Basily

Military rank

Regulations of most military and paramilitary organizations require their members to address each other in V-from; subordinates shall address commanders  as товарищ (tovarisch, "comrade) + military rank, while higher-ups address subordinates by military rank and surname.

Example
[colonel to sgt. Sidorov] Сержант Сидоров, ко мне!
Sergeant Sidorov, front and center!
[sgt. Sidorov to colonel] По вашему приказанию прибыл, товарищ полковник!
Reporting for duty [lit. arrived at your (pl.) request], comrade colonel!

Military men sometimes use same forms of address, albeit in singular, in friendly conversation

Example
Сержант, дай сигарету
Give (sing.) me a cigarette, Sarge

Surname only

May be used as a rather impolite way to address one's subordinates, pupils, students, etc. Especially rude when used with T-form

Example A (T-form)
Cидоров, выходи к доске
Sidorov, come (sing.) to the blackboard
Example B (V-form)
Сидоров, почему Вы не на рабочем месте?
Sidorov, why are you (pl.) away from your workplace?

Full given name only

May be used in V-form between colleagues of the same age. This form became used more often recently to mimic the corporate culture of Western companies, but is not very natural, as one would normally use either имя-отчество (imya-otchestvo) — name & patronimic — or short name

Example
Иван, передайте мне документы
Ivan, give (pl.)  me the documents

Short name only

T-form: Default way of informally addressing acquaintances, colleagues, friends etc. Generally considered impolite when used towards people older than oneself (except close family members, though in Ukraine it is common to address one's parents with V-form)

Example
Ваня, ты куда?
Vanya, where are you (sing.) [going] to?

V-form: Polite way to address one's juniors and subordinates, or distantly known acquaintances, in moderately formal context

Example
[Ivan's boss to Ivan] Ваня, почему Вы не рабочем месте?
Vanya, why are you (pl.) away from your workplace?

Affectionate diminutive

T-form: Demonstrates care and affection, though may be considered baby-talk. Commonly used towards children, between lovers and intimate friends, though generally not between male friends

Example
[Ivan's girlfriend to Ivan] Ванечка,  не уходи!
Vanechka, don’t leave (sing.)

V-form: May be used same way as short name + plural, especially to address one's juniors or people of the opposite sex. In Russian classics, it is commonly depicted to be used by aristocrats, who remained polite even with intimate friends.

Example
[Ivan’s female boss to Ivan] Ванечка, почему Вы не на рабочем месте?
Vanechka, why are you (pl.) away from your workplace?

Vernacular diminutive

Only used with T-form, expressing familiar, highly informal attitude. May be used by elders within a family or close friends, rude otherwise

Example
[Ivan's father to Ivan] Ванька, иди матери помоги
Vanka, go help your mother

Slang diminutive
Expresses informal, brotherly attitude. May be used between male friends

Example
[Ivan's friend to Ivan] Ванёк, наливай!
Fill the glasses, Vanyok!

Patronymic only

Same as slang diminutive, but used mostly within older generations and not limited to males. In this particular case, some patronymics assume vernacular form with the suffixes –ych/vna- rather than –ovich/ovna-, e.g. Ivanovich becomes Ivanych. Sometimes an even more informal patronymic may be derived by using person's father's short name as a base, e.g. Kolyanych instead of Nikolaich (Kolya being short form of Nikolay)

Example
[Mary Ivanovna] Петрович, наливай!
Fill the glasses, Petrovich!
[Ivan Petrovich] Уже налито, Ивановна!
They’re full already, Ivanovna!

References

Slavic titles
Society of Russia
East Slavic languages
Honorifics by language